Martha Grossenbacher (née Martha Derby; born 31 August 1959) is a retired athlete who specialised in sprinting events. She competed at the 1992 Summer Olympics as well one indoor and one outdoor World Championships.

Grossenbacher-Derby was born in Suriname and moved to the Netherlands at the age of 14. She only joined an athletics club in 1978, but by the next year she was already a member of the Dutch national team. At a meet in Portugal she met the Swiss javelin thrower Fred Grossenbacher, whom she married in March 1986. After the European championships of that year she moved to Wimmis in Switzerland and from that point on competed for Switzerland.

Competition record

1Did not start in the quarterfinals

Personal bests

Outdoor
100 metres – 11.65 (-1.4 m/s, Stuttgart 1986)
200 metres – 23.67 (-1.7 m/s, Stuttgart 1986)
400 metres – 52.19 (St. Gallen 1989)
Indoor
50 metres – 6.32 (St. Gallen 1992)
60 metres – 7.34 (Magglingen 1989)

References

1959 births
Living people
Sportspeople from Paramaribo
Dutch female sprinters
Swiss female sprinters
Athletes (track and field) at the 1992 Summer Olympics
Olympic athletes of Switzerland
World Athletics Championships athletes for Switzerland
Surinamese emigrants to the Netherlands
Dutch emigrants to Switzerland
Swiss people of Surinamese descent
Olympic female sprinters